Ainapur, Chincholi is a village in the southern state of Karnataka, India. It is located in the Chincholi taluk of Kalaburagi district in Karnataka.

See also
 Gulbarga
 Districts of Karnataka

References

External links
 http://Gulbarga.nic.in/

Villages in Kalaburagi district